The 2015 ATP World Tour was the global elite professional tennis circuit organized by the Association of Tennis Professionals (ATP) for the 2015 tennis season. The 2015 ATP World Tour calendar comprises the Grand Slam tournaments (supervised by the International Tennis Federation), the ATP World Tour Masters 1000, the ATP World Tour 500 series, the ATP World Tour 250 series, the Davis Cup (organized by the ITF) and the ATP World Tour Finals. Also included in the 2015 calendar is the Hopman Cup, which is organized by the ITF and does not distribute ranking points.

In singles, Novak Djokovic won three major titles, a record six Masters 1000 titles, and the ATP World Tour Finals.

Schedule
This is the complete schedule of events on the 2015 calendar, with player progression documented from the quarterfinals stage.
Key

January

February

March

April

May

June

July

August

September

October

November

Statistical information
These tables present the number of singles (S), doubles (D), and mixed doubles (X) titles won by each player and each nation during the season, within all the tournament categories of the 2015 ATP World Tour: the Grand Slam tournaments, the ATP World Tour Finals, the ATP World Tour Masters 1000, the ATP World Tour 500 series, and the ATP World Tour 250 series. The players/nations are sorted by:
 Total number of titles (a doubles title won by two players representing the same nation counts as only one win for the nation);
 Cumulated importance of those titles (one Grand Slam win equalling two Masters 1000 wins, one ATP World Tour Finals win equalling one-and-a-half Masters 1000 win, one Masters 1000 win equalling two 500 events wins, one 500 event win equalling two 250 events wins);
 A singles > doubles > mixed doubles hierarchy;
 Alphabetical order (by family names for players).

Key

Titles won by player

Titles won by nation

Titles information
The following players won their first main circuit title in singles, doubles, or mixed doubles:

The following players defended a main circuit title in singles, doubles, or mixed doubles:

Top 10 entry
The following players entered the top 10 for the first time in their careers:

ATP rankings
These are the ATP rankings of the top 20 singles players, doubles players, and the top 10 doubles teams on the ATP Tour, at the current date of the 2015 season.

Singles

Number 1 ranking

Doubles

Number 1 ranking

Prize money leaders

Best matches by ATPWorldTour.com

Best 5 Grand Slam & Davis Cup matches

Best 5 ATP World Tour matches

Point distribution

Retirements 
Following is a list of notable players [winners of a main tour title, and/or part of the ATP rankings top 100 (singles) or top 50 (doubles) for at least one week] who announced their retirement from professional tennis, became inactive (after not playing for more than 52 weeks), or were permanently banned from playing, during the 2015 season:

Comebacks
Following are notable players who will come back after retirements during the 2015 ATP Tour season:

See also

2015 WTA Tour
2015 ATP Challenger Tour
Association of Tennis Professionals
International Tennis Federation

References

External links
Association of Tennis Professionals (ATP) World Tour official website
International Tennis Federation (ITF) official website

 
ATP World Tour
ATP Tour seasons